Lene Jenssen (born 22 April 1957 in Fredrikstad) is a Norwegian swimmer. 

She competed at the 1978 World Aquatics Championships in Berlin, where she won a silver medal in 100 m freestyle. 

She also participated at the 1976 Summer Olympics.

Jenssen won 17 gold medals in national championships, and received the King's Cup three times (1976, 1978 and 1979). She was elected Norwegian Sportsperson of the Year 1978.

References

External links

1957 births
Living people
Norwegian female freestyle swimmers
Olympic swimmers of Norway
Swimmers at the 1976 Summer Olympics
World Aquatics Championships medalists in swimming
Sportspeople from Fredrikstad
20th-century Norwegian women